Maymont is a 100-acre (0.156 sq mi) Victorian estate and public park in Richmond, Virginia. It contains Maymont Mansion, now a historic house museum, an arboretum, formal gardens, a carriage collection, native wildlife exhibits, a nature center, and Children's Farm.

In 1893, James H. Dooley, a wealthy Richmond lawyer and philanthropist, and his wife, Sallie, completed their elaborate Gilded Age estate on a site high above the James River.  According to their wishes, after their deaths Maymont was left to the people of Richmond. Over the next 75 years, additional attractions were added.

History
Maymont was named for Major Dooley's wife, Sallie May. 
Construction of the mansion completed in 1893.

The Dooleys also built a summer home on Afton Mountain, Swannanoa, which was completed in 1913.

In 2011, Maymont was named one of the top 10 public spaces by the American Planning Association.

Gardens

The Japanese Garden at Maymont is well tended and features a koi pond and a large waterfall. The Japanese Garden also has a torii arch, rock gardens, and various red maples. It is a blend of two different time periods and a mixture of many styles of gardens. In 1911, a section of the Kanawha Canal was bought to be a part of the garden. Some say they hired a master Japanese gardener by the name of Muto, who had designed other gardens along the East Coast.

Years following Mrs. Dooley's passing, the Japanese garden increasingly lost its magnificence and design. The garden still has its stonework and winding watercourse that leads to its large pond. After realizing the decline of the quality of the garden, Earth Design renovated it in 1978. The new design of the Japanese is considered a "stroll garden" which offers guests at Maymont to see how the changing impact of nature has on the grounds.

Created by Noland and Baskervill of Richmond, The Italian Garden features a pergola, fountains, urns and roses. The  creators of the garden modeled their design after the 15th and 16th century Italian classical style. The garden is laid out on many levels, facing the south which once over looked the James River. The design of the Cascade and the Fountain Court is patterned like the Villa Torlonia near Rome. The Italian Garden was completed in 1910, when the Petersburg granite stonework was laid down.

The arboretum contains more than 200 species of trees and woody plants. It includes a number of "exotic champions" including a Cedrus atlantica, Cryptomeria japonica, Parrotia persica, and Tilia europea. It's said that this collection of exotic and native species of trees was not just used for beauty, but also for scientific purposes. The Dooley's were of sophisticated people and their tree choice only adds on to that description. Some examples of exotic flora that are on grounds include the False Larch and Pseudolarix kaempferia from Japan; the White Enkianthus and the Enkianthis perulatas from China; and the Persian Ironwood. A characteristic of all these trees is the fact that they were planted for optimal growth. This is credited to the same landscaper who helped with the design of the Italian garden, Henry E. Baskervill. Credit goes to the Dooleys as well, who had the final say on the estates design.

Maymont's gardens are popular for outdoor weddings focused around the Italian Garden, the Japanese Garden and numerous gazebos located throughout the grounds. There are ten specialty gardens as well. There is the "Marie's Butterfly Garden" that was finished in 2009. It starts east of the Children's Farm and goes along the horse and cow pastures, down to the Bobcat habitat. Examples of flowers include yarrow, butterfly weed, cone flowers, butterfly bushes, sunflowers, blue spirea and herbs. There is an Herb Garden on grounds as well. This was donated by the Richmond Council of Garden Clubs in 1957. It has been maintained by the Old Dominion Herb Society since 1978. There is even an "Herbs Galor" festival that this garden is a centerpiece for. The herbs are grown for culinary, medicinal potpourri uses.

Fauna
In addition to the farm animals that it keeps in the Children's Farm, Maymont is the permanent home of several animals that are native to the Commonwealth. Many of these have been injured and are otherwise unable to live in the wild. These animals include bald eagles, a bobcat, black bears and foxes. Visitors are also able to see white-tailed deer, elk, and American bison. A nature center is also on the grounds, which exhibits many aquatic animals found in and around Virginia such as otters, alligators, and sharks. Throughout the park, Canada geese, American snapping turtles, numerous species of snakes, and American bullfrogs can be found wild.

See also 
List of botanical gardens in the United States
National Register of Historic Places listings in Richmond, Virginia

References

External links 

The Maymont Foundation
 Richmond, Virginia, a National Park Service Discover Our Shared Heritage Travel Itinerary
Maymont National Register Nomination on the Virginia Department of Historic Resources Site
Maymont: Richmond Commission of Architectural Review Slide Collection

Arboreta in Virginia
Gardens in Virginia
Virginia municipal and county parks
Museums in Richmond, Virginia
Historic house museums in Virginia
Nature centers in Virginia
Transportation museums in Virginia
Carriage museums in the United States
Victorian architecture in Virginia
Houses on the National Register of Historic Places in Virginia
Houses in Richmond, Virginia
Parks in Richmond, Virginia
Zoos in Virginia
National Register of Historic Places in Richmond, Virginia
Houses completed in 1893
Japanese gardens in the United States
Gilded Age mansions